A monks bench or hutch table is a piece of furniture where a tabletop is set onto a chest in such a way that when the table was not in use, the top pivots to a vertical position and becomes the back of a Settle, and this configuration allows easy access to the chest lid which forms the seat of the piece.

Overview
Percy Blandford notes that "whether monks ever used such a bench is debatable, but it is an attractive name".

A monks bench was a useful form at a time when many homes had a large room used for multiple functions, because it allowed a large dining table to swing up and out of the way.

See also
 Onit chair

Notes

References

Benches (furniture)
Tables (furniture)
History of furniture
Furniture
Mechanical furniture